Amabel Ethelreid Normand (November 9, 1893 – February 23, 1930), better known as Mabel Normand, was an American silent film actress, screenwriter, director, and producer. She was a popular star and collaborator of Mack Sennett in their Keystone Studios films, and at the height of her career in the late 1910s and early 1920s had her own film studio and production company. Onscreen, she appeared in twelve successful films with Charlie Chaplin and seventeen with Roscoe "Fatty" Arbuckle, sometimes writing and directing (or co-writing/directing) films featuring Chaplin as her leading man.

In the 1920s, Normand's name was linked with scandal, including the 1922 murder of William Desmond Taylor and the 1924 shooting of Courtland S. Dines. Dines was shot by Normand's chauffeur, who used her pistol. After police interrogation, she was ruled out as a suspect in the murder. Her film career was already in decline by this point, and the scandals worsened her situation. In addition, Normand suffered a recurrence of tuberculosis in 1923, which led to a decline in her health, her retirement from films in 1926, and her death in 1930 at age 36.

Early life and career

Amabel Ethelreid Normand was born in New Brighton, Staten Island, New York (before it was incorporated into New York City) on November 9, 1893. She took her name from her father's only sibling, who had died before her birth in 1892. Her mother, Mary "Minnie" Drury, of Providence, Rhode Island, was of Irish heritage; while her father, Clodman "Claude" George Normand, was French Canadian, with his ancestral lineage dating back to Normandy in France and their surname originally being LeNormand or Le Normand.

For a short time at the start of her career, Normand worked for Vitagraph Studios in New York City for $25 per week, but Vitagraph founder Albert E. Smith admitted she was one of several actresses about whom he made a mistake in estimating their "potential for future stardom." Her intensely beguiling lead performance in the 1911 dramatic short film Her Awakening, directed by D. W. Griffith, drew Normand attention and led to her meeting director Mack Sennett while at Griffith's Biograph Company. She subsequently embarked on a chaotic relationship with him. Sennett later brought Normand to California when he founded Keystone Studios in 1912.

She is credited as being the first film star to receive a pie thrown in the face.

Normand appeared with Charlie Chaplin and Roscoe "Fatty" Arbuckle in many short films. She played a key role in starting Chaplin's film career and acted as his leading lady and mentor in a string of films in 1914, sometimes directing, co-directing, or co-writing films with him. Chaplin had considerable initial difficulty adjusting to the demands of film acting, and his performance suffered for it. After his first film appearance in Making a Living, Sennett felt he had made a costly mistake. However, Normand persuaded Sennett to give Chaplin another chance, and she and Chaplin appeared together in a dozen subsequent films, almost always as a couple in the lead roles. At the start of 1914, Chaplin first played his Tramp character in Mabel's Strange Predicament, although it wound up being the second Tramp film released; Normand directed Chaplin and herself in the film. Later that year, Normand starred with Chaplin and Marie Dressler in Tillie's Punctured Romance, the first feature-length comedy.

Normand opened her own film company in partnership with Sennett in 1916, based in Culver City. She lost the company in 1918 when its parent company, Triangle Film Corporation, experienced a massive shake up which also had Sennett lose Keystone and establish his own independent studio. In 1918, as her relationship with Sennett came to an end, Normand signed a $3,500-per-week contract with Samuel Goldwyn. Around that same time, Normand allegedly had a miscarriage (or stillbirth) with Goldwyn's child.

Scandals

Roscoe Arbuckle trials
Roscoe Arbuckle, Normand's co-star in many films, was the defendant in three widely publicized trials for manslaughter in the 1921 death of actress Virginia Rappe. Although Arbuckle was acquitted, the scandal destroyed his career and his films were banned from exhibition for a short time. Since she had made some of her best works with him, much of Normand's output was withheld from the public as a result. Arbuckle later returned to the screen as a director and actor, but didn't attain his previous popularity despite being exonerated in court.

William Desmond Taylor murder
Director William Desmond Taylor formed a close relationship with Normand based on their shared interest in books. Author Robert Giroux claims that Taylor was deeply in love with Normand, who had originally approached him for help in dealing with an alleged cocaine dependency. Giroux claims that Taylor met with federal prosecutors shortly before his death and offered to assist them in filing charges against her cocaine suppliers, expressing a belief that these suppliers learned of this meeting and hired a contract killer to murder the director. According to Giroux, Normand suspected the reasons for Taylor's murder, but did not know the identity of the man who killed him.

According to Kevin Brownlow and John Kobal in their book Hollywood: The Pioneers, the idea that Taylor was murdered by drug dealers was invented by Paramount Studios for publicity purposes.

On the night of his murder, February 1, 1922, Normand left Taylor's bungalow at 7:45 pm in a happy mood, carrying a book he had lent her. They blew kisses to each other as her limousine drove away. Normand was the last person known to have seen Taylor alive. The Los Angeles Police Department subjected Normand to a grueling interrogation, but ruled her out as a suspect. Most subsequent writers have done the same. However, Normand's career had already slowed, and her reputation was tarnished. According to George Hopkins, who sat next to her at Taylor's funeral, Normand wept inconsolably.

The Dines shooting
In 1924, Normand's chauffeur Joe Kelly shot and wounded millionaire oil broker and amateur golfer Courtland S. Dines with her pistol. In response, several theaters pulled Normand's films, and her films were banned in Ohio by the state film censorship board.

Later career and death 
Normand continued making films and was signed by Hal Roach Studios in 1926 after discussions with director/producer F. Richard Jones, who had directed her at Keystone. At Roach, she made the films Raggedy Rose, The Nickel-Hopper, and One Hour Married (her last film), all co-written by Stan Laurel, and was directed by Leo McCarey in Should Men Walk Home? The films were released with extensive publicity support from the Hollywood community, including her friend Mary Pickford.

In 1926, she married actor Lew Cody, with whom she had appeared in Mickey in 1918. They lived separately in nearby houses in Beverly Hills. However, Normand's health was in decline due to tuberculosis. After an extended stay in Pottenger Sanitorium, she died from pulmonary tuberculosis on February 23, 1930, in Monrovia, California, at the age of 36. She was interred as Mabel Normand-Cody at Calvary Cemetery, Los Angeles. Note that the date of birth listed on her crypt is incorrect (See reference notes 1 and 2. Her birth year was 1893). Normand’s mother is buried in the crypt above Normand's crypt.

Legacy
Normand has a star on the Hollywood Walk of Fame for her contributions to motion pictures at 6821 Hollywood Boulevard.

Her film Mabel's Blunder (1914) was added to the National Film Registry in December 2009.

In June 2010, the New Zealand Film Archive reported the discovery of a print of Normand's film Won in a Closet (exhibited in New Zealand under its alternate title Won in a Cupboard), a short comedy previously believed lost. This film is a significant discovery, as Normand directed the film and starred in the lead role, displaying her talents on both sides of the camera.

Cultural references

 A nod to Normand's celebrity in early Hollywood came through the name of a leading character in the 1950 film Sunset Boulevard, "Norma Desmond", which has been cited as a combination of the names Norma Talmadge and William Desmond Taylor. The film also frequently mentions Normand by name.
 "Hello Mabel" is a song by the Bonzo Dog Doo-Dah Band released in England on their second album The Doughnut in Granny's Greenhouse (released as Urban Spaceman in the US.) in November 1968.
 Normand is mentioned during series 2 episode 1 of Downton Abbey by ambitious housemaid Ethel Parks. Daisy Mason (née Robinson), the kitchen maid, inquires what she is reading and Ethel responds, "Photoplay about Normand. She was nothing when she started, you know. Her father was a carpenter and they'd no money, and now she's a shining film star."
 Singer/songwriter Stevie Nicks wrote a song about the actress entitled "Mabel Normand", which appears on her 2014 album, 24 Karat Gold: Songs from the Vault.

Fictional portrayals
The 1974 Broadway musical Mack & Mabel (Michael Stewart and Jerry Herman) fictionalized the romance between Normand and Mack Sennett. Normand was played by Bernadette Peters and Robert Preston portrayed Sennett.

Normand is played by actress Marisa Tomei in the 1992 film Chaplin opposite Robert Downey, Jr. as Charles Chaplin; by Penelope Lagos in the first biopic about Normand's life, a 35-minute dramatic short film entitled Madcap Mabel (2010); and by Morganne Picard in the motion picture Return to Babylon (2013).

In 2014, Normand was played on television by Andrea Deck in series 2, episode 8 of Mr Selfridge and by Kristina Thompson in the short film Mabel's Dressing Room.

The character played by Alice Faye in Hollywood Cavalcade (1939) was reputed to have been based partly on Normand.

AFI catalog

Filmography 
Some of her early roles are credited as "Mabel Fortesque".

Short films

Feature films

References 
Notes

Further reading
 
 
 Sherman, William Thomas (2006). Mabel Normand: A Source Book to Her Life and Films
 Normand, Stephen (1974). Films in Review September Issue: Mabel Normand – A Grand Nephew's Memoir
 Lefler, Timothy Dean (2016). Mabel Normand: The Life and Career of a Hollywood Madcap.

External links 

 
 
 Mabel Normand at the Women Film Pioneers Project
 Madcap Mabel: Mabel Normand Website
 Mabel Normand Source Book (pdf file)
 Stephen Normand's website
 Bibliography
  Looking for Mabel Normand
 Mabel Normand Home Page
 Films of Mabel Normand on YouTube (playlist)

American silent film actresses
Film producers from New York (state)
American women film directors
American women screenwriters
Silent film comedians
Silent film directors
Silent film producers
1890s births
1930 deaths
20th-century American actresses
American artists' models
American female models
American film actresses
American people of French-Canadian descent
American people of Irish descent
Screenwriters from New York (state)
Film producers from California
Hal Roach Studios actors
Burials at Calvary Cemetery (Los Angeles)
20th-century deaths from tuberculosis
Drug-related deaths in California
People from Staten Island
Actresses from Los Angeles
Actresses from New York City
Articles containing video clips
20th-century American comedians
Women film pioneers
Film directors from New York City
American women film producers
Screenwriters from California
Comedians from California
20th-century American women writers
20th-century American screenwriters
Tuberculosis deaths in California